Rui Agostinho do Couto Lavarinhas (born 9 January 1971) is a Portuguese former professional cyclist.

Major results

1998
1st GP Gondomar
1999
1st Overall Vuelta a Venezuela
1st Stages 3 & 9
1st GP Gondomar
2002
1st  Road race, National Road Championships
1st Overall GP Mosqueteiros – Rota do Marques
1st Stage 3
2003
3rd Overall Volta a Portugal
2005
1st Stage 4 Volta a Portugal

References

External links

1971 births
Living people
Portuguese male cyclists
People from Viana do Castelo
Sportspeople from Viana do Castelo District